Kanungo Institute of Diabetes Specialities (KIDS) is a diabetes multi-speciality hospital in Bhubaneswar, India. KIDS is named after its Founder & Chairman Dr.Alok Kanungo, a diabetologist of international repute.

KIDS is a research based institute and has research-intensive collaborations with:
 Karolinska Institutet, Sweden
 National Institutes of Health, United States
 Institute of Life Sciences, Bhubaneswar, India
 National Institute of Science Education and Research, Bhubaneswar, India

References

External links
 

Diabetes organizations
Hospitals in Odisha
Organisations based in Bhubaneswar
Hospitals established in 2008
2008 establishments in Orissa